This is a list of members of the Australian House of Representatives from 1980 to 1983, as elected at the 1980 federal election.

1 Liberal member Eric Robinson died on 7 January 1981; Liberal candidate Peter White won the resulting by-election on 21 February 1981.
2 Liberal member John McLeay Jr. resigned on 22 January 1981; Liberal candidate Steele Hall won the resulting by-election on 21 February 1981.
3 Liberal member Victor Garland resigned on 22 January 1981; Liberal candidate Allan Rocher won the resulting by-election on 21 February 1981.
4 Liberal member Bob Ellicott resigned on 17 February 1981; Liberal candidate Peter Coleman won the resulting by-election on 11 April 1981.
5 Liberal member Sir William McMahon resigned on 4 January 1982; Labor candidate Michael Maher won the resulting by-election on 13 March 1982.
6 Liberal member Sir Phillip Lynch resigned on 22 October 1982; Liberal candidate Peter Reith won the resulting by-election on 4 December 1982.

References

Members of Australian parliaments by term
20th-century Australian politicians